The Farmers' Voice Party is a Tunisian political party. Its president, Fayçal Tebbini, won a seat in the district of Jendouba after the parliamentary election of 2014.

References

Political parties in Tunisia
Political parties with year of establishment missing
Agrarian parties